La Revista Blanca was a Spanish individualist anarchist magazine of sociology and arts published in Madrid by Joan Montseny (Federico Urales) and Teresa Mañé (Soledad Gustavo) from 1898 to 1905 and in Barcelona from 1 June 1923 till 15 August 1936.

In its first stage, it relied on collaborations by non anarchists such as Leopoldo Alas Clarín, Miguel de Unamuno, Manuel Cossío, José Nakens, Fernando Giner de los Ríos, Jaume Brossa, and Pere Coromines. Also Anselmo Lorenzo, Ricardo Mella, Fernando Tarrida del Mármol, Leopoldo Bonafulla, and Teresa Claramunt wrote regularly in it.

At one point it reached 8000 copies and this success helped it edit Suplemento de la Revista Blanca from 1899 until 1902, later renamed  Tierra y Libertad. The magazine disappeared due to criticism of its main editors Ricardo Mella, Josep Prat, and Leopoldo Bonafulla.

The magazine reappeared in 1923 aligned with a philosophical anarchism critical of the syndicalism of the Confederación Nacional del Trabajo, but it also defended the Federación Anarquista Ibérica. In this second stage, Federica Montseny, Max Nettlau, Adrià del Valle, Charles Malato (from Paris), Diego Abad de Santillán, Jean Grabo, Rudolf Rocker, Sébastien Faure, Luigi Fabbri, and Camillo Berneri were among its collaborators.

La Revista Blanca ended publication in 1936.

Bibliography

External links
Digitalized numbers of La Revista Blanca at the Spanish National Library
List of Spanish working class magazines with details of their existence and La Revista Blanca is included

1898 establishments in Spain
1936 disestablishments in Spain
Anarchism in Spain
Anarchist periodicals
Defunct political magazines published in Spain
Individualist anarchist publications
Magazines established in 1898
Magazines disestablished in 1936
Magazines published in Barcelona
Magazines published in Madrid
Spanish-language magazines